Adham Nabulsi (born 20 November 1993) is a Jordanian Palestinian , vocalist, producer, composer, and songwriter. He debuted on television when he participated on The X Factor (Arabic TV series). Citing religious reasons, Adham Nabulsi retired from the music industry on 20 December 2021.

The X Factor Arabia 
In 2013, Adham auditioned for the first series of the Arabic televised singing competition The X Factor Arabia and he came in third place.

Discography

Singles
Ossetna Kholset (2013)
La Baed Khlena (2014)
Chafei' El Nas (2014)
Keef Bhebak Hayk (2015)
Abali Wadda3ak (2016)
Ma beshbaa mennik (2016)
El Nehayeh El Saideh (2016)
Naskha Mennik (2016)
Meshta (2017)
Shedni Ghmorni (2017)
Taabalni (2018)
Howeh El Hob (2018)
Hada Ma Byentasa (2019)
Btaaref Shuur (2020) 
Hathi Ente W Hatha Ana (2020)
Mish Ayb (2020)
Han AlAn (2020)
Khayef (2021)

Videography

References

External links 

Jordanian male singers
Jordanian people of Palestinian descent
1993 births
Living people
Jordanian artists